Anacithara biscoitoi is a species of sea snail, a marine gastropod mollusk in the family Horaiclavidae.

Description

Distribution
This marine species occurs in the Atlantic Ocean off Western Sahara.

References

 Nolf F. & Swinnen F. (2011) Anacithara biscoitoi (Mollusca: Conoidea: Turridae), a new species from West Sahara (W Africa). Neptunea 10(2): 16–19

External links

biscoitoi
Gastropods described in 2011